Woo Chul (also Woo Cheol, ; born June 20, 1978, in Seoul) is a retired South Korean swimmer, who specialized in middle-distance freestyle events. He is a two-time Olympian (1996 and 2000), and a double medalist at the Asian Games (1994 and 1998).

Woo started his competitive swimming, as a 16-year-old South Korean teenager, at the 1994 Asian Games in Hiroshima, Japan. He helped the South Koreans earn a silver medal in the 4×200 m freestyle relay with a time of 7:33.61.

Woo's Olympic debut came at the 1996 Summer Olympics in Atlanta. He failed to reach the top 16 final in the 400 m freestyle, finishing thirtieth in a time of 4:03.11. He also placed fifteenth as a member of the South Korean team in the 4×200 m freestyle relay (7:45.98).

At the 1998 Asian Games in Bangkok, Thailand, Woo added a bronze medal to his collection for the South Korean swimming team in the 4×200 m freestyle relay. He also attempted for his first individual medal in the 400 m freestyle (4:00.66), but missed the podium by 0.22 seconds behind Hong Kong's Mark Kwok.

Woo competed only in two swimming events at the 2000 Summer Olympics in Sydney. He posted FINA B-standards of 1:53.44 (200 m freestyle) and 3:59.35 (400 m freestyle) from the Dong-A Swimming Tournament in Ulsan. On the first day of the Games, Woo placed twenty-seventh in the 400 m freestyle. He held off his rival Kwok by almost half the body length to lead the second heat in a lifetime best of 3:58.31. The following day, in the 200 m freestyle, Woo placed twenty-ninth on the morning prelims. Swimming in heat three, he came up short in second place by 0.27 of a second behind 17-year-old Damian Alleyne of Barbados, breaking a South Korean record of 1:53.02.

References

1978 births
Living people
South Korean male freestyle swimmers
Olympic swimmers of South Korea
Swimmers at the 1996 Summer Olympics
Swimmers at the 2000 Summer Olympics
Swimmers from Seoul
Asian Games medalists in swimming
Asian Games silver medalists for South Korea
Asian Games bronze medalists for South Korea
Medalists at the 1994 Asian Games
Medalists at the 1998 Asian Games
Swimmers at the 1994 Asian Games
Swimmers at the 1998 Asian Games
20th-century South Korean people